3-Ethylphenol is an organic compound with the formula C2H5C6H4OH.  It is one of three isomeric ethylphenols. A colorless liquid, it occurs as an impurity in xylenols and as such is used in the production of commercial phenolic resins.

Niche use and occurrence
3-Ethylphenol is found in urine samples of female elephants.

It is used as a photographic chemical intermediate and an intermediate for the cyan coupler of photographic paper.
It's a tsetse fly attractant. Therefore, it's a kairomone.

References 

Alkylphenols